G.I. Jane is a 1951 American film musical directed by Reginald Le Borg.

The Los Angeles Times said it "offers some pleasing numbers".

Plot
A civilian, ordered to report to his draft board, slips off into a dream about the army life ahead of him. He is assigned to a remote desert post where the soldiers crave female companionship. He forges orders that brings a platoon of WACs who are forbidden to fraternize with the soldiers.

Cast
 Jean Porter as Jan Smith
 Tom Neal as Tim Rawlings
 Iris Adrian as Lt. Adrian
 Jimmie Dodd as Pvt. Tennessee Jones
 Jeanne Mahoney as Hilda Beck
 Jimmy Lloyd as Lt. Bradford
 Mara Lynn as Pilsnick
 Michael Whalen as Major
 James Parnell as Sergeant

References

External links

G.I. Jane at TCMDB
GI Jane at BFI

1951 films
American musical films
Films directed by Reginald Le Borg
Lippert Pictures films
Military humor in film
1951 musical films
American black-and-white films
1950s English-language films
1950s American films
English-language musical films